"Automatic Lover" is a 1978 song by English singer and musician Dee D. Jackson, released as the second single from her debut album, Cosmic Curves (1978). The song was very successful on the charts in Europe, reaching number two in Sweden, number three in Ireland, number four in the UK and number five in both Norway and West Germany. It also charted in Australia and climbed high up the South African singles charts. In Brazil, the success was such that the Brazilian media produced its own version of Dee D. Jackson. The accompanying music video for the song features Jackson performing with a robot.

Track listing
 7", UK (1978)
A. "Automatic Lover"
B. "Didn't Think You'd Do It"

Charts

References

1978 singles
1978 songs
Disco songs
Mercury Records singles